William Ayloffe  may refer to:

William Ayloffe (judge) (c. 1535–1584), English judge of the Queen's Bench and father of the 1st Baronet
Sir William Ayloffe, 1st Baronet (1563–1627), of the Ayloffe baronets, MP for Stockbridge 
Sir William Ayloffe, 3rd Baronet (1618–1675), of the Ayloffe baronets, Royalist army officer

See also
Ayloffe (surname)